The Hain Mill, also known as the Wernersville Mill, is an historic grist mill complex which is located in Lower Heidelberg Township, Berks County, Pennsylvania.  

It was listed on the National Register of Historic Places in 1990.

History and architectural features
This merchant mill complex includes a two-and-one-half-story stone mill building that was erected in 1798, a combined stone farmhouse and miller's house that was built in 1782, a two-story, stone and frame barn, a frame toolshed, a frame woodshed and a frame outhouse. The mill ceased operation prior to 1961.

It was listed on the National Register of Historic Places in 1990.

References

Grinding mills in Berks County, Pennsylvania
Grinding mills on the National Register of Historic Places in Pennsylvania
Industrial buildings completed in 1798
Houses in Berks County, Pennsylvania
1798 establishments in Pennsylvania
National Register of Historic Places in Berks County, Pennsylvania